Fanny Ramos (born 26 June 1995) is a French kickboxer and Nak Muay Farang. She is the current WMC European Mini Flyweight champion and has unsuccessfully challenged for the ISKA Atomweight World K-1 title. 

At the amateur level, she was the WAKO Bantamweight gold medalist at the 2014 European and 2017 World Championships.

MuaythaiTV.com awarded her the 2018 Fighter of the Year award.

Martial arts career
In 2014 Ramos' gym organized the UMB Fighting 2, during which she faced Julie Teston-Vigne. Ramos won the fight through a unanimous decision.

After this win however, Ramos entered the worst period of her professional career, entering a five fight losing streak. Her first loss came during Muay Thai Explosion XVII, when she lost a unanimous decision to Sara Donghi. Five months later, she lost a unanimous decision to Camila Rosario. Two months after this loss, she dropped another decision to Myriame Djedidi. During Swiss Fight Night, she faced the WAKO K-1 Super Flyweight champion Silvia La Notte. She lost her fourth unanimous decision in a row. The losing streak was punctuated with the first TKO loss of her professional career, to Amy Pirnie during Yokkao 17 & 18.

She broke her losing streak during La Nuit Des Challenges 15, when she scored a TKO win over Sara Donghi, the third of her professional career.

She lost a decision to Cynthia Gonzales and Silvia La Notte during their rematch.

Ramos then entered the most productive period of her career up to that point, going on a four fight winning streak. She managed decision wins over Yolande Alonso, Martina Bernile, Petsingoen Kor Adisorn and Inês Calado.

In 2018 Ramos won her first major title, the WMC European title, with a decision win over Leigh Newton.

In 2019 she fought Cristina Morales for the ISKA Atomweight World K-1 title. Morales won the title with a third round knockout.

Championships and accomplishments

Professional titles
World Muaythai Council
WMC European Mini Flyweight Championship

Amateur titles
World Association of Kickboxing Organizations
 2014 WAKO European K-1 Championship -48 kg 
 2017 WAKO World K-1 Championships -48 kg
International Federation of Muaythai Associations
 2017 IFMA European Muaythai Championships -48 kg

Fight record

|-  style="background:#fbb;"
| 2019-03-30|| Loss ||align=left| Cristina Morales || EFC Ultimate Fight Night II || Lons-le-Saunier, France || KO || 3|| 
|-
! style=background:white colspan=9 |
|-  style="background:#cfc;"
| 2018-11-24|| Win ||align=left| Leigh Newton || Rampage Fighting Championship || Vitry-sur-Seine, France || Decision (Unanimous) || 5 || 3:00
|-
! style=background:white colspan=9 |
|-  style="background:#cfc;"
| 2018-10-21|| Win ||align=left| Lena Kessler || Muay Thai Grand Prix || Paris, France || Decision (Unanimous) || 3 || 3:00
|-
|-  style="background:#fbb;"
| 2018-07-21|| Loss ||align=left| Crystal Newson || Muay Thai Grand Prix || Paris, France || Decision (Unanimous) || 3 || 3:00
|-
|-  style="background:#cfc;"
| 2018-05-05|| Win ||align=left| Inês Calado || Capital Fights 3 || Paris, France || Decision (Unanimous) || 3 || 3:00
|-
|-  style="background:#cfc;"
| 2018-04-14|| Win ||align=left| Petsingoen Kor Adisorn || EFC Ultimate Fight Night || Lons-le-Saunier, France || Decision (Unanimous) || 3 || 3:00
|-
|-  style="background:#cfc;"
| 2017-11-25|| Win ||align=left| Martina Bernile || Bobigny Boxing Day II || Bobigny, France || Decision (Unanimous) || 3 || 3:00
|-
|-  style="background:#cfc;"
| 2017-03-11|| Win ||align=left| Yolande Alonso || Ultimate Fight 3 || Lavérune, France || Decision (Unanimous) || 3 || 3:00
|-
|-  style="background:#fbb;"
| 2016-11-19|| Loss ||align=left| Silvia La Notte || Radikal Fight Night Gold || Charleville-Mézières, France || Decision (Unanimous) || 3 || 3:00
|-
|-  style="background:#fbb;"
| 2016-06-11|| Loss ||align=left| Cynthia Gonzales || Ceinture Lahouari Othmane || Quimperlé, France || Decision (Unanimous) || 3 || 3:00
|-
|-  style="background:#cfc;"
| 2016-05-21|| Win ||align=left| Sara Donghi || La Nuit Des Challenges 15 || Perpignan, France || TKO (Three knockdowns) || 2 || 
|-
|-  style="background:#fbb;"
| 2016-03-19|| Loss ||align=left| Amy Pirnie || Yokkao 17 & 18 || Bolton, England || TKO (Three knockdowns) || 3 || 
|-
|-  style="background:#fbb;"
| 2015-09-19|| Loss ||align=left| Silvia La Notte || Swiss Fight Night || Lugano, Switzerland || Decision (Unanimous) || 3 || 3:00
|-
|-  style="background:#fbb;"
| 2015-06-06|| Loss ||align=left| Myriame Djedidi || Boxing Factory Trophy 2015 || Colomiers, France || Decision (Unanimous) || 3 || 3:00
|-
|-  style="background:#fbb;"
| 2015-04-25|| Loss ||align=left| Camila Rosario || Thai Master || Pau, France || Decision (Unanimous) || 3 || 3:00
|-
|-  style="background:#fbb;"
| 2014-11-08|| Loss ||align=left| Sara Donghi || Muay Thai Explosion XVII || Sassari, Italy || Decision (Unanimous) || 3 || 3:00
|-
|-  style="background:#cfc;"
| 2014-05-18|| Win ||align=left| Julie Teston-Vigne || UMB Fighting 2 || Perpignan, France || Decision (Unanimous) || 3 || 3:00
|-
|-  style="background:#cfc;"
| 2014-04-21|| Win ||align=left| ? || Muaythai Super Fight || Phuket, Thailand || KO || 2 || 
|-
|-  style="background:#cfc;"
| 2014 || Win ||align=left| Lisiane Payet ||  || France || KO ||  || 
|-
|-
| colspan=9 | Legend:    

|-
|-  style="text-align:center; background:#cfc;"
| 2017-11-12 || Win||align=left| Fatima Zhagupova || 2017 WAKO World Championships, Tournament Final || Budapest, Hungary || Decision (Unanimous)|| 3 || 2:00
|-
! style=background:white colspan=8 |
|-
|-  style="text-align:center; background:#cfc;"
| 2017-11-10 || Win||align=left| Esmer Zilan || 2017 WAKO World Championships, Tournament Semifinal || Budapest, Hungary || Decision (Unanimous)|| 3 || 2:00
|-
|-  style="text-align:center; background:#cfc;"
| 2017-10-22 || Win||align=left| Daria Ganzvind || 2017 IFMA European Muaythai Championships, Tournament Final || Paris, France || Decision (Unanimous)|| 3 || 2:00
|-
! style=background:white colspan=8 |
|-
|-  style="text-align:center; background:#cfc;"
| 2017-10-20 || Win||align=left| Songul Kucuktas || 2017 IFMA European Muaythai Championships, Tournament Final || Paris, France || Decision (Unanimous)|| 3 || 2:00
|-
|-  style="text-align:center; background:#fbb;"
| 2015-08-17 || Loss ||align=left| Thanh Truc Nguyen Thi || 2015 IFMA Royal World Cup, Tournament Quarterfinals || Bangkok, Thailand || TKO (Referee stoppage) || 1 || 
|-
|-  style="text-align:center; background:#cfc;"
| 2014-11-16 || Win||align=left| Deniz Demircan || The Princes Of Salm III || France || KO (Knee) || 3 || 
|-
|-  style="text-align:center; background:#cfc;"
| 2014-10-26 || Win||align=left| Fatima Zhagupova || 2014 WAKO European Championships, Tournament Final || Bilbao, Spain || Decision (Unanimous)|| 3 || 2:00
|-
! style=background:white colspan=8 |
|-
|-  style="text-align:center; background:#cfc;"
| 2014-10-24 || Win||align=left|  || 2014 WAKO European Championships, Tournament Semifinal || Bilbao, Spain || Decision (Unanimous)|| 3 || 2:00
|-
| colspan=9 | Legend:

See also
 List of female kickboxers

References 

French kickboxers

1995 births
Living people
Sportspeople from Montpellier